Statistics of the USFSA Football Championship in the 1914 season.

Tournament

First round
Racing Club de Reims 7-0 La fraternelle d'Ailly
FC Lyon 6-2 US Annemasse
Football club de Braux 4-2 Cercle des Sports Stade Lorrain
SM Caen 6-1 US Le Mans
Sporting Club angérien - ASNG Tarbes (Tarbes forfeited)
Red Star Association de Besançon - AS Michelin (Clermont forfeited)

Second round 
AS Montbéliard 5-4 Red Star Association de Besançon

Third round  
Racing Club de Reims 6-0 Football club de Braux
FC Lyon 5-0 AS Montbéliard
Stade quimpérois - SM Caen (Quimper forfeited)

1/8 Final  
Stade Bordelais UC 3-1 Stade toulousain
FC Lyon 3-2 SH Marseille 
Union sportive Servannaise 3-3 SM Caen  
FC Rouen 4-3 Racing Club de Reims
Olympique de Cette - Sporting Club angérien (Saint-Jean forfeited)

Quarterfinals 
 Olympique de Cette 2-1 Stade Bordelais UC
. Union sportive Servannaise 1-0 AS Française
. FC Rouen 0-1 Olympique Lillois
 Stade Raphaëlois 3-1 FC Lyon

Semifinals
. Olympique de Cette 3-1 Stade Raphaëlois
 Olympique Lillois 8-1 Union sportive Servannaise

Final 
Olympique Lillois 3-0 Olympique Cettois

References
RSSF

USFSA Football Championship
1
France